Laramie County Community College (LCCC) is a public community college in Laramie County, Wyoming, with campuses in Cheyenne and Laramie and outreach centers at F.E. Warren Air Force Base and in Pine Bluffs. LCCC was established in 1968.

The college offers nearly 80 associate degrees and almost 30 certificates of completion, along with numerous non-credit classes. Full-time enrollment was 4,333 during the 2011-2012 academic year with the total headcount reaching 6,236.

History 
One of the founding faculty members of LCCC was former Republican State Representative Robert Schliske (1924–2007), who served in the state House from 1971-1975. Schliske began at LCCC as dean of vocational-technical education and thereafter as dean of instruction. Among scholarships offered at LCCC are two named in honor of Robert and Rosalind Schliske and J. Arling and Edvina Wiederspahn. The Schliske award is for study in mass media. Arling Wiederspahn was a longtime trustee of LCCC, a mortician, and a former Laramie County coroner.

Former LCCC librarian Wayne Harold Johnson has represented both houses, consecutively, of the Wyoming State Legislature since 1993. He retired from the Wyoming Senate in 2017.

Academics 
LCCC awarded 682 degrees and certificates during the 2011-2012 academic year.
 231 Associate of Arts degrees
 90 Associate of Science degrees
 237 Associate of Applied Science degrees
 124 Certificates of Completion

Laramie County Community College currently offers classes at a range of levels, from remedial, high-school level (non-college credit) courses up to 2000-level courses.

The college has articulation agreements with about 20 universities, including the University of Wyoming in Laramie, to make sure that most class credits will transfer. LCCC offers teleconference courses as well as online courses. It also serves as a video-conference site for Outreach Credit Programs from the University of Wyoming.

In addition to college credit courses, LCCC offers noncredit courses through the Workforce & Community Development division, which aims to build a stronger workforce and community through partnerships, outreach, professional and workforce training, career services, facility rentals, academic refreshers, and life enrichment classes.

Student services 
LCCC's Cheyenne campus offers a variety of student services, including but not limited to free counseling and advising, on-campus residence halls, dining, free tutoring, free online paper reviews, free access to the Physical Education facilities, and an on-site bookstore. There are also low-cost services available to the community, including equipment rental and use of the site's facilities for conferences and meetings. All student services offered through the main campus in Cheyenne are available to Albany County Campus students in Laramie. Numerous services are available directly on the Albany County Campus.

Athletics 
A member of the National Junior College Athletic Association, LCCC competes in men's basketball, women's volleyball, and men's and women's soccer in Region IX. The college has a rodeo team and is a member of the National Intercollegiate Rodeo Association.

The Recreation and Athletics Center hosts basketball games and volleyball matches.

Publications 
LCCC's students publish a newspaper titled Wingspan, as well as a yearly literary and art magazine, High Plains Register. Publishing classes may be taken for college credit. The LCCC Public Relations Department produces a magazine,The Talon, as well as numerous other publications and multimedia products.

Fine arts 
The college has its own art display, the Esther and John Clay Fine Arts Gallery. The gallery is open Monday-Friday and admission is free. Traveling collections are often displayed, as well as artwork by LCCC students.

References

External links 
 Official website

Community colleges in Wyoming
Educational institutions established in 1968
Buildings and structures in Cheyenne, Wyoming
Education in Albany County, Wyoming
Education in Laramie County, Wyoming
NJCAA athletics